Paulo César Urnau or simply Paulinho (born March 12, 1987 in Foz do Iguaçu) is a Brazilian defensive footballer, who currently plays for Grêmio Esportivo Juventus.

References

External links
furacao
furacao

1989 births
Living people
Brazilian footballers
Club Athletico Paranaense players
Expatriate footballers in Sweden
Rio Branco Sport Club players
Brazilian expatriate sportspeople in Sweden
Association football midfielders